

Buildings and structures

Buildings
 1060 – Nave of new Mont Saint Michel Abbey in Normandy begun.
 c.1060
 Construction of the Baphuon in Yasodharapura, Khmer Empire.
 Lawkananda Pagoda built in Bagan, Pagan Kingdom.
 Shwezigon Pagoda in Nyaung-U, Pagan Kingdom, begun.
 Church of St. Philibert, Tournus in Burgundy completed.
 St Gregory's Minster, Kirkdale in England built.
 1061 – Speyer Cathedral, Germany, consecrated.
 1062 – Construction of Abbey of Sainte-Trinité, Caen, Normandy begun.
 1063
 Pisa Cathedral in Piazza dei Miracoli, Pisa, March of Tuscany begun.
 Rebuilding of Doge's Palace, Venice begun.
 Basilica of San Isidoro, León, Spain consecrated.
 c.1063
 Abbey of Saint-Étienne, Caen, Normandy founded.
 Greensted Church, Essex, England, built.
 1064 – Abbey of Lessay, Normandy begun.
 1065 – St. Maria im Kapitol, Cologne consecrated.
 1066 – Church of San Martín de Tours de Frómista, Spain known.
 1067
 Jumièges Abbey church in Normandy consecrated in the presence of William the Conqueror.
 First of the Kharraqan towers built in Qazvin, Seljukid Iran.
 St. Gereon's church, Cologne begun.
 1068 – William the Conqueror orders the construction of new motte-and-bailey castles in England at Warwick, Nottingham, Lincoln, Huntingdon, Cambridge and York.

Births

Deaths

References 

11th-century architecture
Architecture